The men's javelin throw event was part of the track and field athletics programme at the 1936 Summer Olympics. The competition was held on August 6, 1936.  The final was won by Gerhard Stöck of Germany.

Results

Qualifying

Final

References

Athletics at the 1936 Summer Olympics
Javelin throw at the Olympics
Men's events at the 1936 Summer Olympics